Vibrational Spectroscopy is a bi-monthly peer reviewed scientific journal covering all aspects of Raman spectroscopy, infrared spectroscopy and near infrared spectroscopy. Publication began in December 1990 under the original editors Jeanette G. Grasselli and John van der Maas. The current editor-in-chief is Keith C. Gordon. In addition to research articles and communications, review articles are also published in the journal.

Abstracting and indexing
The journal is abstracted and indexed in:

According to the Journal Citation Reports, the journal has a 2018 impact factor of 1.861.

See also
Journal of Raman Spectroscopy

References

 
Raman spectroscopy
Infrared spectroscopy
English-language journals
Publications established in 1990